Eantis mithridates, also known as the sickle-winged skipper or Jung's dusky wing, is a species of butterfly in the family Hesperiidae. It is found from Argentina, north through tropical America and the West Indies to southern Texas. A regular stray north to central Texas, rarely to Arkansas and Kansas.

The wingspan is 35–45 mm. Adults are on wing all year round in most of its range.

The larvae feed on leaves of Rutaceae species, including Zanthoxylum fagara in Texas and Zanthoxylum monophyllum in tropical America. Adults feed on flower nectar.

Subspecies
Eantis mithridates mithridates - Jamaica
Eantis mithridates papinianus - Trinidad, Cuba
Eantis mithridates sagra - Haiti

External links
Butterflies and Moths of North America

Pyrginae